Stephen Thomas (born 1952) is an American author, builder and television personality. He was the host of the PBS home renovation series This Old House from 1989 to 2003 and of Renovation Nation, on Discovery's former Planet Green channel, for two seasons (2008–2010) until its cancellation.

Biography
Thomas was born in 1952 in Pomona, California, and is the eldest of six children. His interest in construction and renovation came from his father who used to buy and repair old houses to accommodate his growing family. The grandfather of Steve Thomas, Rooney Thomas was also a do-it-yourself guy and an Episcopal missionary in the Alaskan Arctic.

Education
Thomas received his bachelor's degree in philosophy from The Evergreen State College in Olympia, Washington. While at Evergreen, he supported himself as a licensed painting contractor and carpenter.

Sailing and construction
At the age of 13 Thomas decided he wanted to go sailing, so he bought his first sailboat. In 1977, Thomas worked as a carpenter on a  ketch under construction in Antibes, France. He also logged many nautical miles sailing a  wooden sloop from England to San Francisco via the Panama Canal, Galapagos Islands, Marquesas, and Hawaii. In the early 1980s inspired by an old dream he went on sailing across the Pacific. This voyage led him to Satawal where he met Mau Piailug and spent months learning the ancient technique of star path navigation. He moved to Massachusetts in 1980.

Television
In 1989, Thomas returned to Satawal where he filmed the documentary The Last Navigator with Piailug for the PBS series Adventure. In 1989, while researching his next book, on his family's history in the Alaskan Arctic, Thomas was approached by people from the PBS series This Old House who had already screened more than 400 candidates. He was cast to replace Bob Vila and hosted the show from 1989 through 2003.

Since leaving This Old House Thomas has contributed to programming on The History Channel, hosting and producing the Save Our History series, including one program showing George Washington's estate, and another in the Aleutian Islands of Alaska.

Habitat for Humanity International
Thomas first was involved with Habitat in the early 90s following their stories on This Old House and later partnered with them for a five-part series for Renovation Nation. He currently is Spokesman and Ambassador for Habitat for Humanity International with special emphasis on Women Build, Builders Blitz, and ReStore.

Public speaking and personal appearances
Thomas is a popular speaker on green renovation for builders and homeowners. He is especially interested in green, energy efficient, and low maintenance technologies and materials. He has appeared on television shows such as The Early Show on CBS, The Oprah Winfrey Show, and Jon & Kate Plus 8.

Renovation
In 1980, Thomas moved with his family to Salem, Massachusetts, where he renovated an 1836 Colonial revival in a seaport north of Boston. He now resides in St. George, Maine, with his wife and son Sam. He owns his own construction company, Steve Thomas Builders. A recent project involved renovating a cottage and building a timber-frame barn on Hupper island off the coast of Maine. This became a two-part special on Renovation Nation. He recently renovated a 1,000 square foot adobe in Santa Fe, NM, which was the cover story in the January 2013 issue of Su Casa magazine. From 2013 to 2015,  he renovated Sea Cove Cottage in the middle of a fishing village in Maine.

Awards
Thomas received the 1997–1998 Daytime Emmy Award of 'Outstanding Service Show Host' for This Old House, plus nine nominations for the same category.

Books
 The Last Navigator : A Young Man, an Ancient Mariner, the Secret of the Sea (1987) 
 This Old House Kitchens: A Guide to Design and Renovation (1992) 
 This Old House Bathrooms: A Guide to Design and Renovation (1992) 
 This Old House Guide to American Houses (1999)

References

External links
  Steve Thomas' official web site
 Renovation Nation at PlanetGreen.Discovery.com
 
 
 
 

1952 births
Living people
American television hosts
Daytime Emmy Award winners
Evergreen State College alumni
People from Pomona, California
People from Rockport, Maine
People from St. George, Maine
Television personalities from California
Television personalities from Maine
This Old House